is a former Japanese badminton player who affiliated with NTT Tokyo. She graduated from Shiritsushijonawategakuenko School, and then she joined the Fujitsu team. Mizui competed at the 1996 and 2000 Summer Olympics in the women's singles event. She was part of the Japanese team that won the bronze medals at the 1994 and 1998 Asian Games in the women's team event. Mizui won the women's doubles bronze at the 1996 Asian Championships, and also clinched the women's singles title at the 53 National Championships in 1999. She retired from the international tournament after the 2000 Olympics.

Her sister Hisako Mizui also a badminton Olympian who competed in 1992 and 1996.

Achievements

Asian Championships 
Women's doubles

IBF World Grand Prix
The World Badminton Grand Prix sanctioned by International Badminton Federation (IBF) since 1983.

Women's singles

References

External links
 
 

1975 births
Living people
Sportspeople from Nara Prefecture
Japanese female badminton players
Olympic badminton players of Japan
Badminton players at the 2000 Summer Olympics
Badminton players at the 1996 Summer Olympics
Badminton players at the 1994 Asian Games
Badminton players at the 1998 Asian Games
Asian Games bronze medalists for Japan
Asian Games medalists in badminton
Medalists at the 1994 Asian Games
Medalists at the 1998 Asian Games